Johanna Maria Helène Ahlm (born 3 October 1987) is a former Swedish handball player who last played for IK Sävehof and the Sweden women's national handball team. She competed at the 2008 Summer Olympics in Beijing, where Sweden placed 8th, and the 2012 Summer Olympics, where Sweden placed 11th. Ahlm was listed among the top ten goalscorers at the 2008 Olympics tournament.

Achievements
Carpathian Trophy: 
Winner: 2015

References

External links

1987 births
Living people
Handball players from Gothenburg
Swedish female handball players
Olympic handball players of Sweden
Handball players at the 2008 Summer Olympics
Handball players at the 2012 Summer Olympics
Swedish expatriate sportspeople in Denmark
Expatriate handball players
Viborg HK players
FCM Håndbold players
21st-century Swedish women